The Lyell McEwin Hospital (LMH) is a major tertiary hospital located in Adelaide, South Australia that provides medical, surgical, diagnostic, emergency and support services to a population of more than 300,000 people living primarily in Adelaide's north and north eastern suburbs. It is affiliated with the University of Adelaide and the University of South Australia. It is named after Sir Lyell McEwin.

Opening as a small country hospital in 1959, LMH is today a teaching institution for health care professionals. It works closely with the Muna Paiendi Aboriginal Community Health Centre, located on site.

LMH provides new mothers and their babies with the Mothercarer postnatal support service, and has Baby Friendly Health Initiative Accreditation according to World Health Organization guidelines.

Redevelopment 
In 2002 LMH commenced its $314 million, three-part redevelopment program as part of the State Government's modernisation of the state's health system. In October 2003, Premier Mike Rann and Health Minister Lea Stevens opened new maternity, obstetrics and gynaecology sections, as well as a new women's and children's area.

Stage A of the hospital's redevelopment was completed in 2004 and replaced much of the hospital's core clinical and support infrastructure. In April 2005, LMH opened six new operating theatres, a new Emergency Department, new medical imaging facilities and women's health consulting and treatment facilities.

Key elements of the Stage B redevelopment, include a 50-bed, acute and aged care mental health facility, a Radiation Oncology unit, enhanced medical and palliative services, the establishment of an extended emergency care unit, day surgery and ambulatory services and the expansion of support services. In August 2008, new pathology, oncology and gastroenterology units were opened.

Stage C of the hospital's redevelopment, included a multi-level staff and visitor car park (completed early 2010) and an additional 96 inpatient beds. Other improvements in the redevelopment included a helipad facility, teaching and research spaces, a new cardiac catheter laboratory, a second CT scanner and installation of a new MRI machine.

Services

Surgical services 
LMH provides emergency, complex and multi day surgery, along with day surgery and other procedures.  In 2016, a comprehensive 24-hour, seven-day orthopaedic trauma surgery service was expanded at LMH.  Radiology services are contracted out to Everlight Radiology.

Inpatient services 
LMH has the following inpatient services:

Critical Care
Intensive Care

Medicine
Diabetes and Endocrinology
Gastroenterology
General Medicine
Haematology
Infectious Diseases
Paediatric
Palliative Care
Renal
Respiratory
Stroke/Neurology

Women's Health
Antenatal
Gynaecology/Colposcopy
Perinatal Mental Health

Surgical
Breast/Endocrine Surgery
Ear, Nose and Throat
Ophthalmology
Orthopaedics/Fracture
Peri-Operative
Upper Gastrointestinal
Urology
Vascular Surgery

Multidisciplinary and miscellaneous
Adult and Older Persons’ Mental Health
Allied Health
Cancer Services (Chemotherapy and Radiotherapy)
Chronic Disease Management
Diabetes Education Centre
Interdisciplinary High-Risk Diabetes Foot Clinic

Outpatient services 
Lyell McEwin Hospital has the following outpatient services:

Medical
Cardiology/Interventional Cardiology/Electrophysiological studies
Diabetes and Endocrinology
Gastroenterology
General Medicine
Haematology
Hospital at Home
Infectious Diseases
Medical Oncology
Neonatal
Orthogeriatrics
Renal Dialysis
Renal Medicine
Respiratory Medicine and Bronchoscopies
Stroke/Neurology

Surgical
Breast/Endocrine Surgery
Colorectal Surgery
Ear Nose and Throat Surgery
Ophthalmology
Orthopaedics
Paediatric Surgery
Peri-Operative Medicine
Plastic Surgery
Upper Gastrointestinal Surgery
Urology
Vascular Surgery

Women's Health
Obstetrics
Obstetric Medicine

Multidisciplinary and miscellaneous
Allied Health
Early Rehabilitation
Emergency Medicine and Surgery
Medical Imaging
Pathology
Radiation Oncology

See also
List of hospitals in Australia

References

External links
Lyell McEwin Health Service

Hospital buildings completed in 1959
Teaching hospitals in Australia
Hospitals in Adelaide
Hospitals established in 1959
1959 establishments in Australia